Together Again may refer to:

Film and television
 Together Again (film), a 1944 film starring Irene Dunne
 "Together Again", an episode of Adventure Time: Distant Lands
 "Together Again", an episode of Hi-de-Hi!

Music

Albums
 Together Again, album by Mungo Jerry
 Together Again (Buck Owens album), or the title song (see below), 1964
 Together Again (Daniel O'Donnell album), 2007
 Together Again (The Dubliners album), 1979
 Together Again (George Jones and Tammy Wynette album), 1980
 Together Again (Michael Ball and Alfie Boe album), 2017
 Together Again (Ray Charles album), 1965
 Together Again (The Temptations album), 1987
 Together Again (Tony Bennett and Bill Evans album), 1977
 Together Again (Emil Viklický and George Mraz album), 2014
 Together Again!, a 1965 album by Willis Jackson and Jack McDuff
 Together Again!!!!, a 1961 album by Howard McGhee and Teddy Edwards
 Together Again: For the First Time, a 1978 album by Mel Tormé and the Buddy Rich Band
 Together Again: Live at the Montreux Jazz Festival '82, a 1982 album by the Modern Jazz Quartet
 Together Again, a 1984 album by The Guess Who
 Together Again, Again, a 1966 album by Willis Jackson and Jack McDuff
 Together Again for the First Time, a 2001 album by Pulley

Songs
 "Together Again" (Buck Owens song), 1964
 "Together Again" (Hank Smith song), 1972
 "Together Again" (Janet Jackson song), 1997
 "Together Again" (NSYNC song), 1997
 "Together Again", by Evanescence, a non-album track from The Open Door
 "Together Again", by Dave Koz from The Dance
 "Together Again", by Mink
 "Together Again", by Mike Candys with Evelyn
 "Together Again", written by Mel Brooks, from the musical Young Frankenstein
 "Together Again", a song from The Muppets Take Manhattan

See also
 Together (disambiguation)